Penelewey is a hamlet southeast of Playing Place in Cornwall, England, UK. Penelewey is on the B3289 road.

References

Hamlets in Cornwall